Guipos, officially the Municipality of Guipos (Subanen: Benwa Guipos; Chavacano: Municipalidad de Guipos), is a 4th class municipality in the province of Zamboanga del Sur, Philippines. According to the 2020 census, it has a population of 21,738 people.

The town was officially established on October 7, 1991, by virtue of Republic Act No. 7159, signed by President Corazon C. Aquino. It was formed from barangays Guipos, Katipunan, Bagong Oroquieta, and Dalapang of the municipality of San Miguel; barangays Datagan, Dagohoy, Balongating, Baguitan, Magting, Sikatuna, Dacsol, Guling, and Canunan of the municipality of Dumalinao; barangays Lintum, Singclot and Litan of the municipality of Dinas; and barangay Regla of the municipality of San Pablo.

Geography

Barangays
Guipos is politically subdivided into 17 barangays.

 Bagong Oroquieta
 Baguitan
 Balongating
 Canunan
 Dacsol
 Dagohoy
 Dalapang
 Datagan
 Guling
 Katipunan
 Lintum
 Litan
 Magting
 Poblacion (Guipos)
 Regla
 Sikatuna
 Singclot

Climate

Demographics

Economy

References

External links
 Guipos Profile at PhilAtlas.com
 [ Philippine Standard Geographic Code]
Philippine Census Information

Municipalities of Zamboanga del Sur